Franco Chillemi (19 July 1942 – 5 November 2011) was an Italian actor and voice actor.

Biography
Born in Catania, Chillemi began his career in the early 1970s making appearances in at least two films but he was more known to the Italian public as a voice dubber. He was best known for dubbing characters for Italian dubbed Disney films, most notably Governor Ratcliffe in Pocahontas and the 1998 sequel as well as the Archdeacon in The Hunchback of Notre Dame.

In Chillemi's live action roles, he dubbed Oliver Ford Davies, Vittorio Duse, Robert Loggia and James Earl Jones in at least one their movies.

Personal life
Chillemi was the son of film actress Grazia Di Marzà.

Death
Chillemi passed away in Rome on 5 November 2011 at the age of 69.

Dubbing roles

Animation
Governor Ratcliffe in Pocahontas
Governor Ratcliffe in Pocahontas II: Journey to a New World
Archdeacon in The Hunchback of Notre Dame
Don Ira Feinberg in Shark Tale
Cassim in Aladdin and the King of Thieves
Ranjan's father in The Jungle Book 2
"Vlad" in Anastasia
Tony in Lady and the Tramp (1997 redub)
Forte in Beauty and the Beast: The Enchanted Christmas

Live action
Sio Bibble in Star Wars: Episode I – The Phantom Menace
Don Tommasino in The Godfather Part III
Jim Kalla in The Second Civil War
Father Monet in Joan of Arc
Arresting Officer in 101 Dalmatians
Master at Arms in Titanic
Frenchy in Goodfellas
Frank Costello in Bugsy
Dog Kelly in The Quick and the Dead

References

External links

1942 births
2011 deaths
Actors from Catania
Italian male voice actors
Italian male film actors
20th-century Italian male actors
21st-century Italian male actors